Joe Tucker (15 January 1913 – 25 June 1980) was an  Australian rules footballer who played with Geelong in the Victorian Football League (VFL).

Notes

External links 

1913 births
1980 deaths
Australian rules footballers from Victoria (Australia)
Geelong Football Club players
Barwon Football Club players